Khaled Ahmed or variant spellings may refer to:

Khaled Ahmed (born 1992), Bangladeshi cricketer
Khalid Ahmed, Pakistani TV director, producer and actor
Khalid Ahmad (1943–2013), Pakistani Urdu poet and journalist
Kafeel Ahmed (1979–2007), or Khaled Ahmad or Khalid Ahmed, an Islamic terrorist
Syed Khalid Ahmed (born 1965), Pakistani politician 
Khalid Ahmed Kharal (1939–2017), Pakistani politician
Khaled Ahmed Musa (born 1972), Sudanese athlete
Khalid Ahmed Mohamed (born 1976), a Bahraini sport shooter
Khalid Ahmed Khan Lund, a Pakistani politician

See also
Khalid and variants, a name